Manchester is a product of the Industrial Revolution, recognisable for its industrial past. The city is synonymous for its canals, railway viaducts, cotton mills and warehouses which were used to store or house goods before or after transit. As a result of the Industrial Revolution, the city amassed a wide array of warehouses dating from before the Victorian era (1837–1901) to the end of the Edwardian (1910).

The city has examples of six main warehouse types: display of goods, overseas, packing, shipping, railway and canal warehouses. In 1806 there were just over 1,000 but by 1815 this had almost doubled to 1,819. Manchester was dubbed "warehouse city". The earliest were built around King Street although by 1850 warehouses had spread to Portland Street and later to Whitworth Street. They are direct descendants of the canal warehouses of Castlefield.

Warehouses

See also
Architecture of Manchester
Manchester cotton warehouses
Cottonopolis

References

Buildings and structures in Manchester
 Manchester
Lists of buildings and structures in Manchester
 Warehouses
Manchester-related lists